In support of their second studio album, My Universe, the Shires embarked on a seventeen-date UK tour in November and December 2016. In December 2016, the duo announced a second leg of the tour for the spring of 2017.

Set list
The following is the set list is of the 11 December show in London at O2 Shepherd's Bush Empire and represents the set list for the first leg of the tour:

 "Nashville Grey Skies"
 "My Universe"
 "Drive"
 "Naked"
 "Angels" (Robbie Williams cover)
 "All Over Again"
 "Not Even Drunk Right Now"
 "Beats to Your Rhythm"
 "Save Me"
 "Daddy's Little Girl"
 "Brave"
 "State Lines"
 "Friday Night"
 "Jekyll and Hyde"
 "I Just Wanna Love You"
 "Tonight"

Encore:

 "Made in England"
 "Other People's Things"
 "A Thousand Hallelujahs"

The set list of the 2 May show in London at The London Palladium is representative of the second leg of the tour:

 "Nashville Grey Skies"
 "State Lines"
 "Daddy's Little Girl"
 "Only Midnight"
 "Friday Night"
 "Beats to Your Rhythm"
 "Made in England"
 "My Universe"
 "Islands in the Stream" (Bee Gees cover)
 "Other People's Things"
 "A Thousand Hallelujahs"
 "Jekyll and Hyde"
 "Black and White"
 "Naked"
 "Angels" (Robbie Williams cover)
 "Save Me"
 "All Over Again"
 "Drive"

Tour dates

References

2016 concert tours
2017 concert tours